Phu Sa Dok Bua National Park  is a national park that lies in the Amnat Charoen, Mukdahan, and Yasothon Provinces of Thailand. The park's headquarters are located at Amphoe Don Tan, Mukdahan Province.

Points of interest
The park,with an area of 144,375 rai ~  is covered by dwarf dry dipterocarp forest. There is a 423 m high mountain in it. On the mountaintop there are 11 stone pools which are a few metres wide. Oddly, all of them are occupied by different species of colourful lotus found normally in swamps. Local legend says that nobody planted the lotus, that they grew spontaneously. Thus these pools were named "Phu Sa Dok Bua", literally "the mountain of lotus pools".

Nearby is a huge cave which can accommodate hundreds of people. This cavern served as one of the strongholds of the Communist Party of Thailand during the 1960s. The park has also impressive rock terraces and the corresponding views from 386 m high Phu Pha Hom.

See also
List of national parks of Thailand
List of Protected Areas Regional Offices of Thailand

References

External links
Phu Sa Dok Bua National Park Travel Guide
Phu Sra Dok Bua National Park

National parks of Thailand
Geography of Amnat Charoen province
Geography of Mukdahan province
Geography of Yasothon province
Tourist attractions in Amnat Charoen province
Tourist attractions in Mukdahan province
Tourist attractions in Yasothon province
Protected areas established in 1992
1992 establishments in Thailand